Allomyces cystogenus is a species of fungus in the family Blastocladiaceae. It was described as new to science in 1941 by Ralph Emerson.

References

External links

Fungi described in 1941
Fungi of North America
Fungi of South America
Blastocladiomycota